Peißenberg is a municipality in the Weilheim-Schongau district, in Bavaria, Germany. It is situated 7 km southwest of Weilheim in Oberbayern.

Transport 
Both are situated on the Weilheim–Peißenberg railway and offer hourly connections to Augsburg.

Sport
The aeroclub Weilheim-Peißenberg flying at Paterzell airfield is rather successful in glider aerobatics: 2006 German National Champion Markus Feyerabend and Hans-Georg Resch are members of the German national glider aerobatics team.

People 
 Alexander Dobrindt (born 1970), politician (CSU)

References

Weilheim-Schongau